The 1907–08 Drexel Blue and Gold men's basketball team represented Drexel Institute of Art, Science and Industry during the 1907–08 men's basketball season. The Blue and Gold, who were led by head coach Walter S. Brokaw at the beginning of the season until he was replaced by F. Bennett, played their home games at Main Building.

Roster

Schedule

|-
!colspan=9 style="background:#F8B800; color:#002663;"| Regular season
|-

References

Drexel Dragons men's basketball seasons
Drexel
1907 in sports in Connecticut
1908 in sports in Connecticut